Magellan were a progressive metal/rock band formed in San Francisco, California, United States by brothers  Trent and Joel Wayne Gardner in 1985. The band's albums featured a number of well-known guest musicians, such as Ian Anderson, drummer Joey Franco, and bassist Tony Levin. The group co-wrote songs with Chicago frontman Robert Lamm on his album, Living Proof (2012).

In February 2014, Wayne Gardner committed suicide. On June 11, 2016, Trent Gardner also died of undisclosed reasons.

Members
Trent Gardner - lead vocals, keyboards, trombone (1985 - 2016)
 Wayne Gardner - guitars, bass, keyboards, backing vocals (1985 - 2014)

Guest members
 Joey Franco (Twisted Sister, Van Helsing's Curse)- drums and orchestral percussion (Hundred Year Flood)
 Jason Gianni - drums (on Impossible Figures)
 Alan Sweeney - keytar (on Impossible Figures)
 Tony Levin (John Lennon, King Crimson, Peter Gabriel) - bass (Hundred Year Flood)
 Ian Anderson (Jethro Tull) - Flute (Hundred Year Flood)
 George Bellas - guitar (Hundred Year Flood)
 Robert Berry (Alliance, 3) - guitar and bass (Hundred Year Flood)
 Brad Kaiser - drums (Test of Wills)
 Hal Stringfellow Imbrie - bass, Backing vocals (Hour of Restoration, Impending Ascension)
 Doane Perry (Jethro Tull)- drums (Impending Ascension)

Discography

Albums

 Hour of Restoration (Magna Carta, 1991)
 Impending Ascension (Magna Carta, 1994)
 Test of Wills (Magna Carta, 1997)
 Hundred Year Flood (Magna Carta, 2002)
 Impossible Figures (Inside Out, 2003)
 Symphony for a Misanthrope (Inside Out, 2005)
 Innocent God (Muse-Wrapped Records, 2007)

Singles
 "Dust in the Wind" (featuring Rob Lopez) (2012)
 "Hello,Goodbye" (2012)
 "Keep It" (2012)
 "Good to Go?" (2012)
 "The Better Suite" (2013)
 "Cynic's Anthem" (2013)
 "25 or 6 to 4"  (2014)
 "Icons" (2015)

References

External links
 

Heavy metal musical groups from California
American progressive metal musical groups
Progressive rock musical groups from California
Musical groups established in 1985
Musical groups from San Francisco
Magna Carta Records artists
Inside Out Music artists
1985 establishments in California